Artur Dzyhasov (born 4 March 1962) is a Ukrainian wrestler. He competed in the men's Greco-Roman 74 kg at the 1996 Summer Olympics.

References

External links
 

1962 births
Living people
Ukrainian male sport wrestlers
Olympic wrestlers of Ukraine
Wrestlers at the 1996 Summer Olympics